Les Gardiner (25 January 1923 – 26 December 2012) was an Australian rules footballer who played for Essendon in the Victorian Football League (VFL).

He was a member of Essendon's 1946, 1949 and 1950 premiership teams.

References

External links

Essendon Football Club players
Essendon Football Club Premiership players
Australian rules footballers from Victoria (Australia)
1923 births
2012 deaths
Three-time VFL/AFL Premiership players